Nathan Roberts (born 17 February 1986, in Adelaide, Australia) is an Australian volleyball player. 
He attended Brighton Secondary School from 1999 to 2003 and was a member of the school's Special Interest Volleyball program. 
He has played 395 matches for the Australian National Team including the 2006, 2010 & 2014 World Championships.
He was a gold medalist at the 2007 Asian Championships in Jakarta, Indonesia and was the Best Spiker at the 2011 Asian Championships in Tehran, Iran. Nathan has also won the Australian Volleyball League Championship in 2003, Danish Volleyball League Championship in 2006 (Finals MVP), The Slovenian Cup and League Championships in 2015, (Cup MVP) and the French Pro B Championship. (All star team)
He has also competed for Australia at the 2012 Summer Olympics. Nathan said in an interview in 2022 that the highlight of his career was undoubtedly securing back to back championships with the NOB volleyball club at Victoria's Seaside Tournament in 2021 and 2022. Now in semi-retirement, Nathan spends his time playing with South Adelaide Volleyball Club, and the NOBs. His jump having reduced significantly, he spends the majority of his time rolling trying to make his numerous injuries function.

References

Clubs
  Australian Institute of Sport (2002–2004)
  Marienlyst Odense (2005–2006)
  Bayer Wuppertal (2006–2007)
  Castelo Da Maia (2007–2008)
  Apollon Kalamarias (2008–2009)
  Pallavolo Pineto (2009–2010)
  Globo Volley Sora (2010–2011)
  CMC Ravenna (2011–2012)
  Al Shabab Al Arabi (2012–2013)
  Pallavolo Lugano (2013–2014)
  ACH Ljubljana (2014–2015)
  VBC Mondovi (2015–2016)
  MKS Będzin (2016–2017)
  AS Cannes (2017-2019)
  Adelaide Storm (2020-Present)

Sporting achievements

Clubs

National championships
 2003  Australian Men's Volleyball Championships,
 2005/2006  Danish Men's Volleyball Championships,
 2012/2013  UAE Men's Volleyball Championships,
 2013/2014  Swiss Men's Volleyball Championships,
 2014/2015  Slovenian Men's Volleyball Championships,
 2014/2015  Slovenian Cup,
 2017/2018  French Pro B Men's Championship,

1986 births
Living people
Australian men's volleyball players
Volleyball players at the 2012 Summer Olympics
Olympic volleyball players of Australia
Sportspeople from Adelaide
Expatriate volleyball players in Poland